Diamond Valley may refer to:


Places

Australia
 Diamond Valley, Queensland, a rural locality
 Division of Diamond Valley, Victoria
 Shire of Diamond Valley, a former local government area in Victoria

Canada
 Diamond Valley, Alberta, a town formed via the amalgamation of the towns of Black Diamond and Turner Valley

United States
 Diamond Valley (California), a valley in the Plains of Leon in Riverside County, California
 Diamond Valley Lake, a reservoir in Riverside County, California
 Diamond Valley (Nevada)
 Diamond Valley (Washington County, Utah)

Other uses
 Diamond Valley College, a public co-educational school in Diamond Creek, Victoria, Australia
 Diamond Valley United SC, a soccer club based in Greensborough, Victoria
 Diamond Valley Football League, former name of the Northern Football Netball League, Diamond Creek, Victoria
 Diamond Valley Railway, a ridable miniature railway at Eltham Lower Park, Eltham, Victoria